Jessica Sloan (born November 2, 1982, in Calgary, Alberta) is a Canadian swimmer who won six gold medals in the 2000 Summer Paralympics.
In the games, held in Sydney, she won gold in freestyle (100m and 50m), breaststroke (100m), individual medley (200m), relay medley, and freestyle relay.

She was considered for the 2000 Lou Marsh Trophy.

Personal life
Sloan is one of many elite Canadian athletes to have attended high school at the National Sport School operated by the Calgary Board of Education. Sloan is now one of the coaches for the Provo aquatics club or PAC for short along with Ezekial Hall.

References

1982 births
Living people
Swimmers from Calgary
Paralympic swimmers of Canada
Swimmers at the 2000 Summer Paralympics
Paralympic gold medalists for Canada
World record holders in paralympic swimming
Canadian female freestyle swimmers
Canadian female backstroke swimmers
Canadian female breaststroke swimmers
Canadian female medley swimmers
Medalists at the 2000 Summer Paralympics
Paralympic medalists in swimming
S10-classified Paralympic swimmers
Medalists at the World Para Swimming Championships
20th-century Canadian women
21st-century Canadian women